Mamiyar Mechina Marumagal is an Indian Tamil-language film produced by AVM Productions with S. S. Rajendran, M. N. Rajam and G. Varalakshmi starring. The film was released on 23 January 1959. It is a remake of the Marathi film Ganget Ghode Nhahale (1955). The film failed at the box office.

Plot 

Varalakshmi is an affluent woman, but has no biological children. She brings up her nephew S. S. Rajendran as her son. She wants Rajendran to marry and give her a grandchild. Rajendran is in love with M. N. Rajam, who is poor. Varalakshmi does not approve Rajendran to marry Rajam. However, Rajendran defies her and marries Rajam. Varalakshmi throws both of them out of her mansion. How they beget a child, win over Varalakshmi's love and become a happy family again forms the rest of the story.

Cast 
 S. S. Rajendran
 M. N. Rajam
 G. Varalakshmi

Production 
Mamiyar Mechina Marumagal is the first film where M. Saravanan took part in film production; he was credited as a production executive.

Soundtrack 
Music was composed by R. Sudarsanam and the lyrics were penned by Udumalai Narayana Kavi and Kavi Rajagopal.

References

Bibliography

External links 

1950s Tamil-language films
1959 films
AVM Productions films
Films directed by Krishnan–Panju
Films scored by R. Sudarsanam
Tamil remakes of Marathi films